Atlético Echagüe is an Argentine professional basketball team located in Paraná, Entre Ríos. The team competes in the Liga Nacional de Básquet.

Notable players

 Matias Nocedal
 Gelvis Solano
 Josimar Ayarza

References

External links
Official website
Presentation at league website
Presentation at Latinbasket.com

Basketball teams established in 1932
Basketball teams in Argentina
Paraná, Entre Ríos